OTU deubiquitinase 1 is a protein that in humans is encoded by the OTUD1 gene.

Function

Deubiquitinating enzymes (DUBs; see MIM 603478) are proteases that specifically cleave ubiquitin (MIM 191339) linkages, negating the action of ubiquitin ligases. DUBA7 belongs to a DUB subfamily characterized by an ovarian tumor (OTU) domain.

References

External links 
 PDBe-KB provides an overview of all the structure information available in the PDB for Human OTU domain-containing protein 1

Further reading 

Human proteins